Ischalia californica is a species of broad-hipped flower beetle in the family Scraptiidae. It is found in North America.

References

Further reading

 

Tenebrionoidea
Articles created by Qbugbot
Beetles described in 1938